Frank Carter (1881 – June 24, 1927) was a notorious murderer and self-confessed serial killer in Omaha, Nebraska. Confirmed to have committed two murders, Carter claimed to have murdered 43 people. However, reporters doubted most of his claims. The Lexington Herald-Leader called most of the alleged murders "obviously fictitious".

Crimes
Carter was born in County Mayo, Ireland, as Patrick Murphy. The crimes for which he is known began in Omaha, Nebraska, where he worked as a laborer. At the beginning of February 1926, a mechanic was murdered with a .22 caliber pistol with a silencer attached. Soon after, a doctor was murdered, and then a railroad detective was shot six times in neighboring Council Bluffs, Iowa. On February 15, Omaha's newspapers recommended the city black out all lights after an exposé on previous murders showed that the victims had been standing in their windows at home when they were shot. During daylight hours, the sniper shot another in the face and fired through more than a dozen lighted windows. Businesses in Omaha came to a standstill, streets cleared and the city's entertainment venues emptied for more than a week. Other crimes included shooting indiscriminately into a Downtown Omaha drugstore.

More than two weeks after his first murder, Carter was captured in Iowa, 30 miles south of Council Bluffs at Bartlett in Fremont County, Iowa. Carter readily admitted his crimes. After a month-long trial where Carter's lawyers pleaded insanity, Carter was convicted on one count of first degree murder for killing Dr. A.D. Searles. He was also charged with first degree murder for killing mechanic William McDevitt, but that charge was withdrawn. After his conviction, Carter further admitted to being a parole breaker. (He had been released from the Iowa State Penitentiary in 1925, after serving time for killing cattle.)
Frank Carter's Nebraska Prison Number was #9277.
He was executed by electrocution on June 24, 1927 at the Nebraska State Penitentiary in Lincoln, Nebraska. Carter was quoted as saying "Let the juice flow" just before he died.

See also
 Crime in Omaha
 History of Omaha

References

1881 births
1926 in the United States
1927 deaths
20th-century executions of American people
American criminal snipers
Crime in Omaha, Nebraska
Executed Irish people
History of Omaha, Nebraska
Irish people convicted of murder
Irish emigrants to the United States (before 1923)
Irish people executed abroad
People from County Mayo
People executed by Nebraska by electric chair
Prisoners and detainees of Iowa
People convicted of murder by Nebraska
Suspected serial killers